Wall Drug Store, often called simply Wall Drug, is a roadside attraction and tourist stop located in the town of Wall, South Dakota, adjacent to Badlands National Park. Wall Drug consists of a collection of cowboy-themed stores, including a drug store, gift shop, several restaurants, and various other stores, as well as an art gallery and an 80-foot (24 m) brontosaurus sculpture. Unlike a traditional shopping mall, all the stores at Wall Drug operate under a single entity rather than being run individually. The New York Times has described Wall Drug as "a sprawling tourist attraction of international renown [that] draws some two million annual visitors to a remote town."

History

The small town drugstore made its first step towards fame when it was purchased by Ted Hustead in 1931. Hustead was a Nebraska native and pharmacist who was looking for a small town with a Catholic church in which to establish his business. He bought Wall Drug, located in a 231-person town in what he referred to as "the middle of nowhere," and strove to make a living. Business was very slow until his wife, Dorothy, thought of advertising free ice water to parched travelers heading to the newly opened Mount Rushmore monument  to the west. From that time on, business was brisk.

Ted’s son, Bill Hustead, also a pharmacist, returned to Wall and joined the family business in 1951.  Under his direction, Wall Drug grew into a cowboy-themed mall and department store. He created the Art Gallery Cafe, with a design inspired by Club “21” in New York City, one of his favorite restaurants.  Wall Drug includes a western art museum, a chapel based on the one found at New Melleray Abbey near Dubuque, Iowa, another Bill Hustead creation, and an  brontosaurus that can be seen right off Interstate 90.  It was designed by Emmet Sullivan who also created the dinosaurs at Dinosaur Park in  Rapid City and Dinosaur World in Arkansas.

Bill Hustead had seven children and his oldest child, Rick Hustead, is the current proprietor of Wall Drug Store.

Marketing campaign
Wall Drug earns much of its fame from its self-promotion. Billboards advertising the establishment can be seen for hundreds of miles throughout South Dakota and the neighboring states. In addition, many visitors of Wall Drug have erected signs throughout the world announcing the miles to Wall Drug from famous locations. By 1981 Wall Drug was claiming it was giving away 20,000 cups of water per day during the peak tourist season, lasting from Memorial Day until Labor Day, and during the hottest days of the summer.

Most of Wall Drug's advertisement billboards can be found on an approximately  stretch of Interstate 90 from Minnesota to Billings, Montana.  The signs are created by South Dakota billboard artists, including Dobby Hansen and Barry Knutson of Philip.

Today 

To date, Wall Drug still offers free ice water, but as they have become more popular, they have started to offer free bumper stickers to aid in promotion, and coffee for 5 cents. Some popular free bumper stickers read "Where the heck is Wall Drug?" and "Have You Dug Wall Drug?".

Wall Drug has over 300 original oil paintings in the Western art Gallery Dining Rooms. This acquisition represents one of the best private collections of original Western and Illustration Art in the country. Artists featured include N. C. Wyeth, Harvey Dunn, Dean Cornwell, Louis Glanzman, and Harold Von Schmidt.

When the United States Air Force was still operating Minuteman missile silos in the western South Dakota plains, Wall Drug used to offer free coffee and donuts to service personnel if they stopped in on their way to or from Ellsworth Air Force Base ( west on Interstate 90). Wall Drug continues to offer free coffee and donuts to active military personnel.

Ted Hustead died in 1999. The following day, South Dakota Governor Bill Janklow began his annual State of the State address by commemorating Hustead as "a guy that figured out that free ice water could turn you into a phenomenal success in the middle of a semi-arid desert way out in the middle of someplace."

Media references 
In 1981, Wall Drug was featured in Time magazine as one of the largest tourist attractions in the north. 
In his 1989 book The Lost Continent, Bill Bryson wrote, "It's an awful place, one of the world's worst tourist traps, but I loved it and I won't have a word said against it." 
The history of Wall Drug was told in a two-episode story arc of the podcast The Radio Adventures of Dr. Floyd. 
In 2016 Z Nation featured Wall Drug in season 3, episode 8.
The 2020 film Nomadland features scenes where the main characters work at Wall Drug, and later visit the dinosaur statue.

Gallery

Further reading

See also 
 South of the Border, a similar attraction off Interstate 95 in South Carolina,   just south of the border with North Carolina
 Badlands National Park
 Breezewood, Pennsylvania
 Uranus, Missouri

References

External links

 www.walldrug.com — Wall Drug site
 RoadsideAmerica.com's Report
 Wall Drug in postcards – History site

Roadside attractions in South Dakota
Buildings and structures in Pennington County, South Dakota
Pharmacies of the United States
Landmarks in South Dakota
Restaurants in South Dakota
American companies established in 1931
Retail companies established in 1931
1931 establishments in South Dakota
Tourist attractions in Pennington County, South Dakota
Health care companies based in South Dakota
South Dakota culture